Brian Sakic (born September 4, 1971) is a former professional ice hockey player.

Playing career
Born in Burnaby, British Columbia, Sakic started his junior career with the Swift Current Broncos of the Western Hockey League (WHL). His brother, Hockey Hall of Famer Joe Sakic, was also on the team. Brian was drafted in the fifth round, 93rd overall in the 1990 NHL Entry Draft by the Washington Capitals; however, he never played a single game in the NHL. He set WHL records for career assists, with 405, and points, with 591. His jersey number has been retired by the Tri-City Americans.

Sakic retired from professional hockey in 1999.

Career statistics

Awards
 WHL West Second All-Star Team – 1990
 WHL West First All-Star Team – 1991

References

External links

1971 births
Canadian ice hockey centres
Canadian people of Croatian descent
Erie Panthers players
Flint Generals players
Flint Generals (CoHL) players
Sportspeople from Burnaby
Living people
Swift Current Broncos players
Tri-City Americans players
Washington Capitals draft picks
Ice hockey people from British Columbia